The American Educational Research Association (AERA, pronounced "A-E-R-A") is a professional organization representing education researchers in the United States and around the world. AERA's mission is to advance knowledge about education and promote the use of research in educational practice.

Organization and membership 
AERA is led by an Executive Director (Felice J. Levine in 2020) and a President (H. Richard Milner, IV from Vanderbilt University in 2022–23). AERA's governance structure includes the Council, Executive Board, standing committees, and award committees. Temporary committees, task forces, and working groups are initiated for other specific needs.

AERA has 25,000 members, including scientists, teachers, students, administrators, state and local agencies, counselors, and evaluators. The range of disciplines represented by the membership includes education, psychology, statistics, sociology, history, economics, philosophy, anthropology, and political science. There are 12 divisions covering different research areas in education. AERA is a member organization of the Federation of Associations in Behavioral & Brain Sciences, which represents learned societies dedicated the scientific understanding of psychology and behavior.

Early history 
AERA (known originally as National Association of Directors of Educational Research) was founded in 1916 as an interest group within the National Education Association Department of Superintendence. The association's eight founders – Burdette R. Buckingham, Albert Shiels, Leonard P. Ayres, Frank W. Ballou, Stuart A. Courtis, Edwin Hebden, George Melcher, and Joseph P. O'Hern – were all directors of education research in various parts of the United States. They met at the 1915 NEA Department of Superintendence annual meeting and came to the idea of starting an organization to advance education research. Their constitution was approved the following year.

Early topics of interest for early AERA included research bureau operations, measurement techniques, and particular school situations. Active membership in the early association was reserved for research bureau directors and their assistants. The association's early years revolved around the annual convention. Between meetings, the association published an internal quarterly newsletter, the Educational Research Bulletin.

By the end of the World War I in 1918, the association had 36 active members and four honorary members and was affecting public policy, visible in the school districts that started to change student coursework and education practices as a result of standardized tests. Mental testing developments, primarily psychometrics as a result of the First World War, new subfields of education, and the growth of education research at the post-secondary level challenged the association to widen its mission. The association opened its membership to include anyone who could demonstrate their competence as a researcher indicated by their published or unpublished work. In 1922, members voted to adopt a name that represented their goal of representing the interests of all American education researchers – Educational Research Association of America. Over the years that followed, membership saw a dramatic increase, particularly among university personal, which grew from 48% to 69% between the years 1923 and 1927.

The association's original publication, the Journal of Educational Research, began in 1919.

The ability of education research to provide guidance for education practitioners was a struggle throughout the association's beginnings, with only ambiguous known relationships between testing and learning outcomes. The association recognized the need to establish theoretical foundations for the field of education research. In 1928, the association changed its name to the American Educational Research Association, as it is currently known.

During the Great Depression, the association's public school affiliates struggled with tight finances and uncertain employment, but during the same time, university education researchers dominated the field and emerged as a unique social entity. Also during this time, AERA officials grew their relationships with like-minded associations, and a new journal, the Review of Educational Research, began as a reference work, summarizing recent studies. While early topics in Review of Educational Research focused primarily on education psychology and administration, the publication broadened its coverage in the mid-1930s in response to diversification in the field.

The role of education research in the progressive education movement was a source of contention between education researchers, some of whom felt that it should play an active role in policy issues, and others who felt that it should be used primarily for professional discourse. As the field continued to advance, much of the knowledge did not translate into practice, an issue that is still widely debated today. These divisions in the field made it difficult for education researchers to speak with one voice. Just prior to World War II, Review of Educational Research made the case that because science could not speak to goals and choices, education research should contribute as one source of many to shaping American education.

Publications 
AERA publishes books and reports, along with sponsoring seven peer-reviewed journals:
 AERA Open
American Educational Research Journal
Educational Evaluation and Policy Analysis
Educational Researcher
Journal of Educational and Behavioral Statistics (published jointly with the American Statistical Association)
Review of Educational Research
Review of Research in Education

Events 
AERA's Annual Meeting held every spring is the largest gathering of scholars in the education research field with approximately 14,000 participants. The five-day conference is a showcase of research studies across education disciplines at all levels.

AERA also hosts the annual Brown Lecture in Education Research, which highlights the role of research in advancing equality in education. The first Brown Lecture was held in 2004 to commemorate the 50th anniversary of the Brown v. Board of Education decision.

Education research and policy 
AERA is expanding the availability of their resources by participating in the open access movement. AERA currently offers Educational Researcher (journal) open access, as well as an Online Paper Repository containing presentations from the 2010 Annual Meeting forward. An open access, peer-reviewed journal – AERA Open – launched in 2014.

On the policy front, AERA is actively involved in revisions to the common rule. Executive Director Felice J. Levine served on the National Research Council committee charged with reviewing proposed regulations. The committee published its report in early 2014.

AERA helps lead an ongoing initiative as part of the social science research community to increase federal funding for education research, particularly research in the social and behavioural sciences.

In addition, AERA is active in the reauthorization of the Institute of Education Sciences bill – Strengthening Education through Research Act – which was advanced by the United States House Committee on Education and the Workforce in April 2014.

Education research initiatives 
AERA is involved in several education research initiatives, ranging from specific advocacy topics to supporting projects that serve the larger community. AERA supports the Education Research Conferences Program, which awards grants for conferences on ground-breaking topics. AERA's Education Research Service Projects is designed to encourage researchers to offer their expertise to organizations and groups who may have a need but not the funds to engage their assistance.

One topic area that AERA has been immensely involved is affirmative action. In 2013, AERA presented an amicus brief on the importance of science in a major affirmative action case – Fisher v. University of Texas at Austin.
AERA also presented an amicus brief on affirmative action in December 2015.

References

Further reading

External links
 American Educational Research Association

Educational organizations based in the United States
Research organizations in the United States
Social sciences organizations
1916 establishments in the United States
Organizations established in 1916